The Charrua are an indigenous people of South America living in Argentina, Brazil, and Uruguay.

Charrua or Charrúa may also refer to:

Language
Charrúa language
Charrúan languages, the language family including Charrúa

Places
Charrua, Rio Grande do Sul, Brazil
Charrúa Gap, Livingston Island
Charrúa Ridge, Livingston Island
Los Charrúas, Entre Ríos Province, Argentina

Sports
Charrua Rugby Clube, in Porto Alegre, Rio Grande do Sul, Brazil
Estadio Charrúa, in Carrasco, Montevideo, Uruguay